Trần Hữu Đông Triều (born 20 August 1995) is a Vietnamese footballer who plays as a centre back for V.League 1 club Hoàng Anh Gia Lai.

Honours
Becamex Bình Dương
Vietnamese Super Cup: Runner-up: 2019
Vietnam U19
AFF U-19 Youth Championship: Runner-up 2013, 2014
Hassanal Bolkiah Trophy: Runner-up 2014

References

External links

1995 births
Living people
Vietnamese footballers
Association football central defenders
V.League 1 players
Hoang Anh Gia Lai FC players
People from Quảng Nam province
Competitors at the 2017 Southeast Asian Games
Southeast Asian Games competitors for Vietnam